Fred Earl Washington, Sr. (June 14, 1944 – 1985) was an American football offensive tackle in the National Football League for the Washington Redskins.  He played college football at the University of North Texas.  His son Fred Washington, Jr., a defensive tackle at Texas Christian University, was drafted by the Chicago Bears in the second round of the 1990 NFL Draft, but was killed in a car accident during his rookie season.

References

1944 births
1985 deaths
American football offensive tackles
North Texas Mean Green football players
Washington Redskins players
People from Marlin, Texas
Road incident deaths in Illinois